Influenza A virus subtype H7N9 (A/H7N9) is a bird flu strain of the species Influenza virus A (avian influenza virus or bird flu virus). Avian influenza A H7 viruses normally circulate amongst avian populations with some variants known to occasionally infect humans. An H7N9 virus was first reported to have infected humans in March 2013, in China.  Cases continued to be reported throughout April and then dropped to only a few cases during the summer months. At the closing of the year, 144 cases had been reported of which 46 had died. It is known that influenza tends to strike during the winter months, and the second wave, which began in October, was fanned by a surge in poultry production timed for Lunar New Year feasts that began at the end of January. January 2014 brought a spike in reports of illness with 96 confirmed reports of disease and 19 deaths. As of April 11, 2014, the outbreak's overall total was 419, including 7 in Hong Kong, and the unofficial number of deaths was 127.

History 
A 5th epidemic of the H7N9 virus began in October 2016 in China. The epidemic is the largest since the first epidemic in 2013 and accounts for about one-third of human cases ever reported. The cumulative total of  laboratory-confirmed cases since the first epidemic is 1,223. About 40 percent have died. The CDC estimates that the H7N9 virus has the greatest potential compared with other influenza A viruses to cause a pandemic, although the risk is low because, like other type A viruses, it is not easily transmitted between people in its current form.

The World Health Organization (WHO) has identified H7N9 as "...an unusually dangerous virus for humans." Most of the cases resulted in severe respiratory illness, with a mortality rate of roughly 30 percent. Researchers have commented on the unusual prevalence of older males among H7N9-infected patients. While several environmental, behavioral, and biological explanations for this pattern have been proposed, the reason remains unknown.

It has been established that many of the human cases of H7N9 appear to have a link to live bird markets. As of January 2014, there has been no evidence of sustained human-to-human transmission; however, a study group headed by one of the world's leading experts on avian flu reported that several instances of human-to-human infection are suspected. The H7N9 virus does not kill poultry, which makes surveillance much more difficult.

Chinese scientists announced the development of a vaccine on October 26, 2013, but said that H7N9 had not spread far enough to merit widespread vaccination. Research regarding background and transmission is ongoing.

H7N9 virus
Influenza A viruses are divided into subtypes based on two proteins on the surface of the virus: hemagglutinin (HA) and neuraminidase (NA). The avian influenza A(H7N9) virus designation of H7N9 identifies it as having HA of the H7 subtype and NA of the N9 subtype.

Avian influenza A H7 viruses are a group of influenza viruses that normally circulate among birds. H7 influenza infections in humans are uncommon, but have been confirmed worldwide in people who have direct contact with infected birds. Most infections have been mild involving only conjunctivitis and mild upper respiratory symptoms. The avian influenza A(H7N9) virus is a subgroup among this larger group of H7 viruses. Although some H7 viruses (e.g. H7N2, H7N3 and H7N7) have occasionally been found to infect humans, H7N9 has previously been isolated only in birds, with outbreaks reported in the Netherlands, Japan, and the United States. Until the 2013 outbreak in China, no human infections with H7N9 viruses had ever been reported.

Genetic characterisation of avian influenza A(H7N9) shows that the H7N9 virus that infects human beings resulted from the recombination of genes between several parent viruses noted in poultry and wild birds in Asia. It is most closely related to sequences found in samples from ducks in Zhejiang province in 2011. Evidence so far suggests that the new H7N9 virus might have evolved from at least four origins. It is hypothesized that the gene that codes for HA has its origin in ducks and the gene that codes for NA has its origin with ducks and probably also wild birds. Six internal genes originated with at least two H9N2 chicken viruses. The HA genes were circulating in the East Asian flyway in both wild birds and ducks, while the NA genes were introduced from European lineages and transferred to ducks in China by wild birds through migration along the East Asian flyway.

Dr. Keiji Fukuda, WHO's assistant director-general for health security and environment, remarked at a Toronto interview that "I think we are genuinely in new territory here in which the situation of having something that is low path in birds (yet) appears to be so pathogenic in people... And then to have those genetic changes ... I simply don't know what that combination is going to lead to." "Almost everything you can imagine is possible. And then what's likely to happen are the things which you can't imagine," he also remarked.

According to the deputy director of CDC's influenza division, the genetic makeup of H7N9 is "disturbingly different" from that of the H5N1 virus that has infected more than 600 people over the past 10 years and killed more than half of them. "The thing that's different between them is the H5 virus still maintains a lot of the avian or bird flu characteristics, whereas this H7N9 shows some adaptation to mammals. And that's what makes it different and concerning for us. It still has a ways to go before it becomes like a human virus, but the fact is, it's somewhere in that middle ground between purely avian and purely human."

In August 2013, it was announced that scientists plan to create mutant forms of the virus so they can gauge the risk of it becoming a lethal human pandemic. The genetic modification work will result in highly transmissible and deadly forms of H7N9, and is being carried out in several high security laboratories around the world.

Epidemiology 
Most human infections with avian influenza viruses, including Asian H7N9 virus, occur after exposure to infected poultry or contaminated environments. Asian H7N9 viruses continue to circulate in poultry in China. Most reported patients with H7N9 virus infection have had severe respiratory illness (e.g., pneumonia). Rare instances of limited person-to-person spread of this virus have been identified in China, but there is no evidence of sustained person-to-person spread. Some human infections with Asian H7N9 virus have been reported outside of mainland China, Hong Kong or Macao but all of these infections have occurred among people who had traveled to China before becoming ill. Asian H7N9 viruses have not been detected in people or birds in the United States.

Human cases

Reported cases in 2013

On March 31, 2013, the Centre for Health Protection (CHP) of the Department of Health of Hong Kong and the Chinese National Health and Family Planning Commission notified the World Health Organization of three confirmed human cases of influenza A (H7N9) in Shanghai and Anhui (illness onset between February 19 and March 15, 2013). On April 2, the CHP confirmed four more cases in Jiangsu province, all considered in critical condition in hospitals in Nanjing, Suzhou, and Wuxi. In a statement, the CHP said that no epidemiologic links had been found between the four patients and so far no other H7N9 infections have been identified in 167 of their close contacts.

The first reported death associated with H7N9 was an 87-year-old man who died on March 4. A second man, aged 27, died on March 10.  On April 3, Chinese authorities reported another death, bringing the number to three.

On April 4, the number of reported cases was 14, with 5 deaths. The two victims were a 48-year-old man and a 52-year-old woman, both from Shanghai.

On April 5, a farmer, aged 64, living in Huzhou (Zhejiang province), died, raising the death toll to 6. On April 6, the Chinese Ministry of Health reported 18 positive cases, death toll still at 6. Two days later, positive cases rose to 24 and one death case from Shanghai brought the death toll to 7.

On April 9, the Chinese National Health and Family Planning Commission announced "an additional three laboratory-confirmed cases of human infection with influenza A(H7N9) virus." The new patients "are two patients from Jiangsu – an 85-year-old man who became ill on 28 March 2013" and a "25-year-old pregnant woman who became ill on 30 March 2013" and "a 64-year-old man from Shanghai who became ill on 1 April 2013, and died on 7 April 2013". As of April 9, a "total of 24 cases have been laboratory confirmed with influenza A(H7N9) virus in China, including seven deaths, 14 severe cases and three mild cases." In Jiangsu, more than "600 close contacts of the confirmed cases are being closely monitored."

In an update on April 11, Xinhua reported 38 identified cases and 10 deaths. According to the WHO, of the 28 patients who had survived their infections, 19 illnesses were severe and 9 were mild. The WHO said they were monitoring 760 close contacts and so far had no evidence of ongoing human-to-human transmission.

On April 13, a seven-year-old girl from Beijing was the first confirmed case of H7N9 bird flu outside eastern China.  On April 14, Xinhua Chinese state media reported two human cases in central Henan just west of the area where the disease had been centered. Totals included 61 infected and 13 dead.
On April 14, Chinese officials also reported the first asymptomatic case in Beijing. A health department notice suggested that a 4-year-old boy had no clinical symptoms and was tested during surveillance of high-risk groups.

On April 17, a total of 82 cases had been confirmed, with 17 deaths.  On April 18, China reported 87 confirmed cases. On April 20, there were 96 confirmed cases, of which 18 were fatal. On the next day, confirmed cases rose to 102 and fatal cases to 20. On April 22, there were 104 cases with 21 deaths. On April 23, 3 more cases were reported in an update from the WHO. All of the newly reported cases were in older men from eastern China. Two cases came from the Zhejiang province and the third was from the Anhui province. Total cases count reached 108 with 22 deaths.

On April 24, a case was confirmed by the Taiwanese Government, marking the first case outside of Mainland China.

On April 25, the National Health and Family Planning Commission said that a total of 109 H7N9 cases had been reported within mainland China, including 23 deaths. However, Anne Kelso, director of the WHO Collaborating Centre for Reference and Research on Influenza, VIDRL, Australia, reported that researchers had seen a "dramatic slowdown" in human cases in Shanghai after the city's live poultry markets were closed on April 6. On the following day, cases in mainland China rose to 118.

On April 28, four provinces, Zhejiang, Shandong, Jiangxi, and Fujian, reported new cases, raising the total number of cases in mainland China to 125 with 24 deaths.  On May 2, there were 127 confirmed cases in mainland China, of which 27 were fatal, and including the case in Taiwan there were a total of 128 cases worldwide. On May 6, in a weekly update, China's Ministry of Health announced there were 129 confirmed cases in mainland China with 31 deaths, for a total of 130 cases worldwide.

On May 7, Hong Kong's Centre for Health Protection reported that there were 130 confirmed cases of H7N9 avian flu in mainland China following the hospitalization of a 79-year-old woman from China's Jiangxi province, bringing the count to 131 cases.

The Ministry of Health of People's Republic of China reported on July 10 that in the month of June, there was only 1 confirmed case, and there were a total of 132 confirmed cases in Mainland China as of June 30, 2013 (43 fatal, 85 patient recovery cases). Though there is a slow increase in the number of cases, China recently warned that the transmission of H7N9 virus might be active again by autumn and winter seasons.

In August, Guangdong province confirmed its first case of H7N9 bird flu, a 51-year-old woman  in critical condition after having been admitted to a hospital on August 3.

, China reported to the WHO that "rare and sporadic human infections with H7N9" have been reported with "the total number of cases reported to 137, including 45 deaths" in China. The CDC and U.S. government H7N9 preparedness efforts have continued over the summer and are "continuing to watch this situation closely".

, two cases of H7N9 were reported in Hong Kong. Hong Kong reported its first death from H7N9 on 26 December 2013.

On December 31, Taiwan's CDC released a press statement indicating that an 86-year-old man from Jiangsu Province, China, who was visiting Taiwan, became ill and tested positive for H7N9 flu. This is the second case in Taiwan, the first being in April.

Reported cases in 2014
On January 21, 2014, it was reported that a 31-year-old thoracic surgeon had died four days previously, the first medical professional to die from H7N9 flu. There was no evidence that he had been in contact with live poultry recently.
Yuen Kwok-yung, a University of Hong Kong microbiologist, said, "If the diagnosis is confirmed and no [bird] exposure history is elicited, this does point slightly more to the possibility that H7N9 may be more transmissible between humans than H5N1".

On January 28, 2014, it was reported by the Chinese Center for Disease Control and Prevention that the virus had killed 20 people in China in 2014, with the total number of human infections at 102. That is comparable to 144 confirmed cases, including 46 deaths, in the whole of 2013. At the end of January, more than half of the cases in 2014 had been in Zhejiang, with another 24 in Guangdong, and eight in Shanghai. The director of the Chinese National Influenza Center, Shu Yuelong, said a large-scale H7N9 epidemic still remains unlikely because the virus has not yet mutated in such a way that would allow person to person transmission.

On February 13, 2014, it was reported that a 67-year-old female tourist from China had been diagnosed with the H7N9 virus while visiting Malaysia.

Reported cases in 2015
In January 2015, A Canadian visitor to China was diagnosed with H7N9 after she returned home to British Columbia. After returning to Canada on January 12, she felt ill on January 14.

In June 2015, 15 cases of H7N9 infection were reported in China.

Reported cases in late 2016 and 2017 (5th epidemic)
Beginning in October 2016 China began experiencing a 5th epidemic of H7N9, the largest since the first epidemic in 2013. For the 5th epidemic, the WHO reported 460 human infections as of early March 2017, which accounts for about one-third of cases ever reported since this strain of influenza virus first appeared in 2013. The cumulative total of  laboratory-confirmed cases since the first epidemic is 1,223. About 40 percent have died. As of September 8, 2017, the World Health Organization and CDC reported a total number to 759 infections with 281 deaths for the fifth epidemic.

Symptoms and treatment
According to the World Health Organization, symptoms include fever, cough, and shortness of breath, which may progress to severe pneumonia. The virus can also overload the immune system, causing what is known as a cytokine storm. Blood poisoning and organ failure are also possible.  In an article in the New England Journal of Medicine, doctors reported that most of the patients with confirmed cases of H7N9 virus infection were critically ill and that approximately 20% had died of acute respiratory distress syndrome (ARDS) or multiorgan failure.

Antigenic and genome sequencing suggests that H7N9 is sensitive to neuraminidase inhibitors, such as oseltamivir and zanamivir. The use of these neuraminidase inhibitors in cases of early infection may be effective, although the benefits of oseltamivir treatment have been questioned.

Transmission

Information released in 2014 indicated that 75% of those that came down with H7N9 influenza had previously been exposed to domestic poultry.  In April, 2013, the World Health Organization (WHO) said H7N9 was "unlikely" to become a pandemic and that there was no evidence of human-to-human transmission. In late July, 2013, however, Chinese scientists found evidence that person-to-person transmission was possible, but would not transmit easily.

In April 2013, it was also reported that the virus had been found only in chickens, ducks, and pigeons at live poultry markets and that no migratory birds had tested positive for the virus, easing concerns about that route of transmission. However, later investigation demonstrated that H7N9 may infect wild songbirds and caged parakeets, which then shed the virus into their environment. This finding implies that these birds may potentially serve as intermediate hosts with the ability to facilitate transmission and dissemination of H7N9.

At an April 26 news conference, the WHO assistant director-general for health stated, "This is an unusually dangerous virus for humans. We think this virus is more easily transmitted from poultry to humans than H5N1." Furthermore, there is great concern because unlike the H5N1 virus, H7N9 does not cause visible disease in poultry, which makes surveillance, prevention, and control of the virus in poultry extremely difficult.

On April 30, it was announced that the Ministry of Agriculture of the People's Republic of China had asked the Director General of the World Organisation for Animal Health (OIE) to send OIE experts to assess the situation and provide advice.  According to the information and data collected, it was confirmed that many of the human cases of H7N9 appeared to have a link with live bird markets, but to that date no human cases or animal infections of H7N9 had been detected on poultry farms. The OIE experts made the hypothesis that people could be infected through exposure to infected birds in markets or to a contaminated environment such as live poultry markets where the virus is present.  They believe that live bird markets may play a key role in human and animal infections with H7N9 and that, even if the overall level of infection is relatively low (having not been detected yet in poultry farms), live bird markets provide an environment for amplification and maintenance of the H7N9 virus.

The OIE mission also confirmed that currently infection with H7N9 does not cause visible disease in poultry and therefore veterinary services must be especially involved in preventing its further spread. According to the April 30 report, there is no evidence to suggest that the consumption of poultry or eggs could transmit the virus to humans.   More assessment is needed to know whether poultry vaccination could be considered as a control option for H7N9. It will also be important to verify whether the H7N9 virus is transmissible from humans to animals because if established, it could be a potential channel for the global spread of the virus.

The number of cases detected after April fell abruptly. The decrease in the number of new human H7N9 cases may have resulted from containment measures taken by Chinese authorities, including closing live bird markets, or from a change in seasons, or a possibly a combination of both factors. Studies indicate that avian influenza viruses have a seasonal pattern, much like human seasonal influenza viruses. If this is the case, H7N9 infections – in birds and people – may pick up again when the weather turns cooler in China. Limited person-to-person spread of bird flu is thought to have occurred rarely in the past, most notably with avian influenza A (H5N1). According to the US CDC, based on previous experience, some limited human-to-human spread of this H7N9 virus would not be surprising if the virus reemerges in the fall. Furthermore, according to the WHO,  since migratory birds were first implicated in H7N9 transmission, the possibility that the virus may spread into other regions or countries with colder weather cannot be excluded, given the widespread bird migratory patterns.

Human to human transfer of virus
In a study published in July 2013, an international team led by Yoshihiro Kawaoka, one of the world's leading experts on avian flu, reported that while avian flu viruses typically lack the ability to transfer through respiratory droplets, studies using ferrets, who like humans infect one another through coughing and sneezing, showed that one of the H7N9 strains isolated from humans can transmit through respiratory droplets. Kawaoka says, “H7N9 viruses combine several features of pandemic influenza viruses, that is their ability to bind to and replicate in human cells and the ability to transmit via respiratory droplets.” Further, because several instances of human-to-human infection are suspected, Kawaoka stated that “If H7N9 viruses acquire the ability to transmit efficiently from person to person, a worldwide outbreak is almost certain since humans lack protective immune responses to these types of viruses.”

On August 6, 2013, the British Medical Journal released the results of  epidemiological investigations conducted after a family cluster of two patients were infected with avian H7N9 in March 2013 and later died in April and May. A 60-year-old man became infected after an exposure to poultry and his daughter, who had not been exposed to poultry but had cared for her ill father, became infected as well. Genome sequence and analyses of phylogenetic trees showed that both viruses were almost genetically identical. Forty-three close contacts of the infected patients did not become ill and they all tested negative for haemagglutination inhibition antibodies specific for avian H7N9. It was concluded that the infection of the daughter probably resulted from close contact with her father during unprotected exposure, suggesting that the virus was able to transmit from person to person. However, the researchers consider the transmissibility of the virus to have remained limited and non-sustainable.

Mortality
In the month following the report of the first patient, more than 100 people had been infected, an unusually high rate for a new infection; a fifth of those patients had died, a fifth had recovered, and the rest remained critically ill. Keiji Fukuda, the World Health Organization's (WHO) assistant director-general for health, security and the environment, identified H7N9 as "...an unusually dangerous virus for humans."  By early May 2013, the number of new cases sharply declined and the mortality rate remained at about 20%.

As of 2019, the laboratory-confirmed patient fatality risk of H7N9 infection is 39%. However, laboratory-confirmation is biased towards detecting the severest patients. People with H7N9 can have a wide range of symptoms, including asymptomatic and mild infections, but the rate of such infections is less understood. Based on the influenza-like illness surveillance system in China, the number of symptomatic H7N9 infections is likely substantially higher than the number of laboratory-confirmed cases. The estimated symptomatic case fatality risk is 0.16% in the 2013 wave and 0.10% in the 2013/14 wave. A serological study conducted in Guangzhou from December 2013 to April 2014 estimated 3,200 times the number of laboratory-confirmed cases during the same period of time and, for the first time, estimated the infection fatality risk for H7N9 to be 0.036% in the 2013/2014 wave.

Age/gender distribution

Researchers have commented on the unusual prevalence of older males among H7N9-infected patients. Two-thirds of persons who are ill from H7N9 are 50 years of age or older, which is an older age curve than that for H5N1. In addition, two-thirds of persons infected by H7N9 are male. Possible reasons for the prevalence of older males among H7N9-infected patients include: a difference in exposure between males and females due to gender-associated practices; biological differences between males and females; and the differences in healthcare-seeking behavior and healthcare access between males and females. Both the median age and male to female relationship appear to have remained stable: The February 2014, WHO report stated "...37 cases, the median age was 60 years, ranging from 5-84 years, with a male to female ratio of 3.6:1."

Dr. Yuzo Arima and his colleagues at WHO report "While poultry exposure appears to be a common risk factor, the age distribution among reported cases also raises the question why so few young adults (i.e. those of working age exposed to poultry as vendors/LBM [live bird market] workers/breeders/transporters) have been reported. This not only suggests greater exposure among elderly men but also a possible greater biological susceptibility to more severe outcomes." Danuta M. Skowronski, MD, of the British Columbia Centre for Disease Control and three colleagues put forward the hypothesis that older Chinese men have more lifetime exposure to H7 avian flu viruses and thus have immune responses which are weakly cross-reactive but not protective. This immune phenomenon is called antibody-dependent enhancement (ADE), and is perhaps best known in cases of Dengue fever when a person who has previously been infected with one serotype of Dengue fever becomes infected many months or years later with a different serotype. It is thought to occur when weakly cross-reactive antibodies form bridging complexes to facilitate uptake and replication of related but non-identical variants.

Vaccine
Although China has been praised for its quick response, some experts believe that there would be great difficulty providing adequate supplies of a vaccine if the virus were to develop into a pandemic. According to an article in the Journal of the American Medical Association (JAMA) in May 2013, "Even with additional vaccine manufacturing capacity... the global public health community remains woefully underprepared for an effective vaccine response to a pandemic...There is no reason to believe that a yet-to-be-developed pandemic A(H7N9) vaccine will perform any better than existing seasonal vaccines or the A(H1N1)pdm09 vaccines [about 60% to 70% effectiveness], particularly with regard to vaccine efficacy in persons older than 65 years."

On October 26, 2013, Chinese scientists announced that they had successfully produced an H7N9 vaccine, the first influenza vaccine to be developed entirely in China. It was developed jointly by researchers from Zhejiang University, Hong Kong University, the Chinese Center for Disease Control and Prevention, China's National Institute for Food and Drug Control, and the Chinese Academy of Medical Sciences. Chinese National Influenza Center director Shu Yuelong said the vaccine passed tests on ferrets and had been approved for humans, but H7N9 has not spread far enough to merit widespread vaccination. The vaccine was developed from a throat swab of an infected patient taken April 3.

On November 12, 2013, US scientists at Novavax, Inc. announced their successful clinical testing of an H7N9 vaccine in the New England Journal of Medicine. They had previously described the development, manufacture, and efficacy in mice of an A/Anhui/1/13 (H7N9) viruslike particle (VLP) vaccine produced in insect cells with the use of recombinant baculovirus. The vaccine combined the HA and neuraminidase (NA) of A/Anhui/1/13 with the matrix 1 protein (M1) of A/Indonesia/5/05. The study enrolled 284 adults (≥18 years of age) in a randomized, observer-blinded, placebo-controlled clinical trial of this vaccine.

The Centers for Disease Control and Prevention (CDC) began sequencing and development of a vaccine as routine procedure for any new transgenic virus. The CDC and vaccine manufacturers are developing a candidate virus to be used in vaccine manufacturing if there is widespread transmission. On September 18, 2013, NIH announced that researchers have begun testing an investigational H7N9 influenza vaccine in humans. Two Phase II trials are collecting data about the safety of the vaccine, immune system responses to different vaccine dosages, both with and without adjuvants. Healthy adults 19 to 64 years of age will be enrolled in the two studies. The inactivated-virus vaccine was made with H7N9 virus that was isolated in Shanghai, China. Adjuvants are being tested with the vaccine to determine if an adequate immune response can be produced. In addition, during a pandemic, adjuvants may be used as part of a "dose-sparing strategy".

In response to a request from the CDC and the Biomedical Advanced Research and Development Authority, following the unprecedented immediate release of the H7N9 flu virus gene sequences from the first human cases, by scientists at the China CDC through the GISAID Initiative, the J. Craig Venter Institute, and Synthetic Genomics Vaccines, Inc. began working with Novartis to synthesize the genes of the new viral strain, and supplied these synthesized genes to the CDC.

Reactions
The scientific community has praised China for its transparency and rapid response to the outbreak of H7N9.   In an editorial on April 24, 2013, the journal Nature said "China deserves credit for its rapid response to the outbreaks of H7N9 avian influenza, and its early openness in the reporting and sharing of data." This, in spite of initial worries by Chinese scientists and officials that they might lose credit for their work in isolating and sequencing the novel H7N9 virus, after learning that pharmaceutical company Novartis and the J. Craig Venter Institute had used their sequences to develop US-funded H7N9 vaccine without offering to collaborate with the Chinese team, according to Nature. They believed, the usage of their data was initially not handled in the spirit of the GISAID sharing mechanism, which requires scientists who use the sequences to credit and propose collaboration with those who deposited the data in GISAID. Nature cited a Chinese official who concluded that this situation was quickly mitigated once communication channels were opened and the parties agreed to collaborate, thanks to GISAID president Peter Bogner.

Despite concerns that vaccination of poultry against the H5N1 avian influenza virus over the last decade might have made it harder for Chinese veterinary technicians to spot the recent spread of the H7N9 virus, China's Agriculture Ministry defended its policy of large-scale vaccination of poultry against the earlier bird flu strain, saying that it was not interfering with its efforts now to identify the emerging H7N9 virus.

On April 15, 2013, the RIWI Corporation, led by researcher Neil Seeman of the University of Toronto released data on 7,016 Chinese “fresh” (i.e. non-panel based) Internet users – with a 24.08% response rate – over 20 hours. The level of contagion awareness was 31% in Beijing, 38% in Hangzhou, 33% in Nanjing, 40% in Shanghai, 52% in Ürümqi, and 28% in Zhengzhou (Chi Square; P = 0.05). The result far exceeds that of other internet surveys, suggesting an intense relevancy of interest and sense of urgency related to the current disease outbreak in the minds of average Chinese citizens.

Efforts to prevent spread of disease
In April 2013, Shanghai's health ministry ordered culling of birds after pigeon samples collected at the Huhuai wholesale agricultural products market in Songjiang District of Shanghai showed H7N9 
On April 4, 2013, Shanghai authorities closed a live-poultry-trading zone and began slaughtering all birds. Poultry trading areas in two other areas of the Minhang district were also closed. On April 6, 2013, all Shanghai live poultry markets closed temporarily in response to the H7N9 found in the pigeon samples. The same day, Hangzhou also closed its live poultry markets.

After gene sequence analysis, the national avian flu reference laboratory concluded that the strain of the H7N9 virus found on pigeons was highly congenic with those found on persons infected with H7N9 virus, the ministry said. On April 22, 2013, Forbes quoted Chinese state media reporting $2.7 billion in poultry industry losses.

When January 2014 brought a dramatic increase in reports of disease, the Chinese government responded by halting live poultry trading in three cities in Zhejiang province where 49 cases and 12 deaths had been reported. In addition, live poultry trading in Shanghai was halted for three months. In Hong Kong, authorities reacted to the discovery of H7N9 in live chickens from the province of Guangdong by suspending imports of fresh poultry from mainland China for 21 days, culling 20,000 chickens, and other measures in an effort to control the spread of the virus.

On February 18, 2014, it was announced that the Chinese government would extend the ban for four months. The health minister also said that they plan to prevent diseased birds from entering the market by setting up a facility where imported poultry can be quarantined to ensure they are disease-free.

International response

The WHO did not advise against travel to China at that point in time, as there was no evidence of human-to-human transmission of the virus.

United States

On April 9, 2013, the Centers for Disease Control and Prevention (CDC) activated its Emergency Operations Center (EOC) in Atlanta at Level II, the second-highest level of alert. Activation was prompted because the novel H7N9 avian influenza virus has never been seen before in animals or humans and because reports from China have linked it to severe human disease. EOC activation will "ensure that internal connections are developed and maintained and that CDC staff are kept informed and up to date with regard to the changing situation."

Canada

On April 10, 2013, the Public Health Agency of Canada (PHAC) and the Canadian Food Inspection Agency (CFIA) spelled out bio-safety guidance for handling the H7N9 virus.  They stated that work with live cultures must be conducted in biosafety level 3 (BSL-3) containment. They also said that studies growing H7N9 virus should not be done in labs that culture human influenza viruses and that personnel should not have contact with susceptible animals for 5 days after handling H7N9 samples.

Malaysia

Malaysia announced that it would temporarily ban Chinese chicken imports.

Vietnam

Vietnam announced that it would temporarily ban Chinese poultry imports.

Singapore

All hospitals were informed to remain vigilant, and to notify Singapore's Ministry of Health (MOH) immediately of any suspected cases of avian influenza in individuals who have recently returned from affected areas in China. MOH advised returning travellers from affected areas in China (Shanghai, Anhui, Jiangsu, and Zhejiang) to look out for signs and symptoms of respiratory illness, such as fever and cough, and seek early medical attention if they are ill with such symptoms. MOH also advised individuals to inform their doctors of their travel history, should they develop these symptoms after returning to Singapore.

Taiwan

On 3 April 2013, the Executive Yuan activated Taiwan's Central Epidemic Command Center (CECC) in response to the epidemic in mainland China. The Executive Yuan deactivated the CECC for H7N9 influenza on 11 April 2014.

During this period, 24 meetings were convened with representatives from 24 central government agencies including the Council of Agriculture, the Ministry of Transportation and Communications, and the Ministry of Education, along with 22 city and county governments. Meetings were attended by regional commanding officers and deputy commanding officers of the Communicable Disease Control Network.

On 17 May 2013, a ban became effective on the slaughtering of live poultry at traditional wet markets, which eliminated the risk of animal-to-human transmission of avian influenza.

See also

 Antigenic shift
 Influenza A virus subtype H9N2
 Influenza A virus subtype H5N1
 Pandemic H1N1/09 virus
 Influenza research
 Zoonosis

References

H7N9
2013 health disasters
Health disasters in China
health